The year 1919 in film involved some significant events.



Top-grossing films (U.S.)
The top three 1919 released films by box office gross in North America are as follows:

Events
February 5 – Charlie Chaplin, Mary Pickford, Douglas Fairbanks and D. W. Griffith launch United Artists.
March – Oscar Micheaux premieres The Homesteader, the first feature-length race film, starring pioneering African American actress Evelyn Preer, becoming the first African American to produce and direct a motion picture.
May 13 – D. W. Griffith's first film to be released by United Artists, Broken Blossoms, has its premiere in New York City.
 August 29 – The Miracle Man displayed Lon Chaney's talent for make-up and made him famous as a character actor.
 September 1 – United Artists release their first film, His Majesty, the American starring Douglas Fairbanks.
 September 18 – Ufa-Palast am Zoo in Berlin opens rebuilt as a permanent cinema with the première of Ernst Lubitsch's Madame Dubarry.
 September 25 - Dalagang Bukid (The Country Maiden), the first Filipino feature-length film made in the Philippines, released.
 October 24 - The Capitol Theatre in New York City becomes one of the largest cinemas in the world with 4,000 seats.
 November 16 – Constance Talmadge becomes a star with the release of A Virtuous Vamp.
 November 23 - Cecil B. DeMille's Male and Female is released and grosses $1,256,226.59, establishing Gloria Swanson as a worldwide star.
 Harold Lloyd begins holding test screenings of his films and modifying them based on audience feedback, a technique which continues in use.
 Tri-Ergon sound-on-film technology is developed by three German inventors, Josef Engl, Hans Vogt (engineer), and Joseph Massole; however, the era of sound films is over 6 years away.

Notable films released in 1919 around the world

A
Anne of Green Gables, directed by William Desmond Taylor; starring Mary Miles Minter and Paul Kelly
The Avalanche directed by George Fitzmaurice starring Elsie Ferguson
L'atleta fantasma/ The Ghost Athlete (Italian), directed by Raimondo Scotti, starring Mario Guaita-Ausonia and Elsa Zara, features a masked superhero/ wrestler character

B
The Beetle, directed by Alexander Butler – (GB) based on the 1897 novel The Beetle: A Mystery by Richard Marsh
The Belle of New York, directed by Julius Steger; starring Marion Davies
The Better 'Ole – (GB)
Blind Husbands, directed by and starring Erich von Stroheim
Bolshevism on Trial, directed by Harley Knoles
The Boy in Blue (Knabe in Blau), directed by F.W. Murnau – (Germany)
Broken Blossoms, directed by D.W. Griffith, starring Lillian Gish and Richard Barthelmess
Bumping into Broadway, starring Harold Lloyd and Bebe Daniels

C
Captain Kidd's Kids, a Harold Lloyd short
The Cinema Murder, directed by George D. Baker; starring Marion Davies
Country Maiden (Dalagang Bukid), directed by Jose Nepomuceno; starring Atang de la Rama - Philippines
Creaking Stairs (aka Dearie) directed by Rupert Julian for Universal Pictures, starring Mary MacLaren and Herbert Prior

D
Daddy-Long-Legs, starring Mary Pickford
Damaged Goods, directed by Alexander Butler – (GB)
Dance of Death/ Totentanz (German) written by Fritz Lang,  directed by Otto Rippert, starring Werner Krauss
The Dark Star, directed by Allan Dwan; starring Marion Davies and Norman Kerry
The Delicious Little Devil, starring Mae Murray and Rudolph Valentino
The Devil's Locksmith (Austrian) directed by Franz Ferdinand, starring Ferdinand and Herr Ruibar
Different from the Others, directed by Richard Oswald, starring Conrad Veidt – (Germany)
The Doll, directed by Ernst Lubitsch – (Germany)
Don't Change Your Husband, directed by Cecil B. DeMille, starring Gloria Swanson

E
The Echo of Youth, directed by Ivan Abramson

F
The Face at the Window (Australian) directed by Charles Villiers, starring D.B. O'Conner, Agnes Dobson and Claude Turton, based on the 1897 stage play by F. Brooke Warren
The False Faces, directed by Irvin Willat, starring Henry B. Walthall and Lon Chaney
The First Men in the Moon – (GB)

G
Getting Mary Married, directed by Allan Dwan; starring Marion Davies and Matt Moore
The Grim Game, starring Harry Houdini

H
The Haunted Bedroom (aka The Ghost of Whispering Oaks) directed by Fred Niblo for Thomas H. Ince, starring Enid Bennett (Niblo's wife) and Dorcas Matthews
Haunting Shadows, directed by Henry King, starring H.B. Warner and Edward Peil Sr., based on the 1906 novel The House of a Thousand Candles by Meredith Nicholson
Hawthorne of the U.S.A. directed by James Cruze, starring Wallace Reid
Heart o' the Hills directed by Sidney Franklin, starring Mary Pickford
Here Comes the Bride directed by John S. Robertson, starring John Barrymore, Faire Binney
His Majesty, the American, starring Douglas Fairbanks
The Homesteader, directed by Oscar Micheaux, starring Evelyn Preer

I
Intoxication, directed by Ernst Lubitsch, starring Asta Nielsen (Germany)

J
The Jack of Hearts, starring Hoot Gibson
J'accuse (French), written and directed by Abel Gance for Pathe Films – (France) starring Romuald Joube, Severin-Mars, and Maryse Dauvray; this was Gance's most acclaimed film and he remade it with sound in 1938

K
The Knickerbocker Buckaroo, starring Douglas Fairbanks

L
The Life Line, directed by Maurice Tourneur, starring Wallace Beery
Lilith and Ly (Austrian) written by Fritz Lang, directed by Erich Kober, starring Elga Beck and Ernst Escherich 
The Lost Battalion
The Love Cheat, starring June Caprice and Creighton Hale
Love's Prisoner, starring Olive Thomas
Lucrezia Borgia (Italian) directed by Augusto Genina, starring Diana Karenne

M
Madame DuBarry, directed by Ernst Lubitsch, starring Pola Negri and Emil Jannings – (Germany)
Madness / Wahnsinn (German) produced and directed by Conrad Veidt, who also starred in the film; adapted from a novel by Kurt Muenzner
Male and Female, directed by Cecil B. DeMille, starring Gloria Swanson and Thomas Meighan
The Master Mystery, (serial), starring Harry Houdini
The Miracle Man, starring Thomas Meighan, Lon Chaney and Betty Compson
The Mistress of the World, directed by Joe May (Weimar Republic)
The Monkey's Paw (British) lost film based on the story by W. W. Jacobs first published by 1902, and the related one-act stage play written by Louis N. Parker in 1907
My Lady's Garter, directed by Maurice Tourneur
My Wife, the Movie Star, directed by Ernst Lubitsch (Germany)

N
Nabeshima Neko Sodo (Japanese) a ghost-cat film produced by Nikkatsu Films, starring Matsunosuke Onoe, based on the Kabuki play by Joko Segawa III
Okazaki Kaibyo-den (Japanese) starring Matsunosuke Onoe, another ghost-cat movie based on an early 1820s Japanese novel (which was adapted as a Kabuki play in 1827)

O
The Oyster Princess (Die Austerprinzessin) – (Germany)

P
The Phantom Honeymoon, written and directed by J. Searle Dawley (who directed the 1910 Thomas Edison Frankenstein), starring Leon Dadmun and Marguerite Marsh
The Plague of Florence / Die Pest in Florenz (German) written by Fritz Lang, directed by Otto Rippert, starring Otto Mannstaedt and Anders Wikman; this was Fritz Lang's adaptation of The Masque of the Red Death by Edgar Allan Poe

R
Ravished Armenia (aka Auction of Souls) – directed by Oscar Apfel, starring Aurora Mardiganian
The Roaring Road, directed by James Cruze, starring Wallace Reid

S
Sahara, starring Louise Glaum, written by C. Gardner Sullivan
Satanas / Satan (German) written by Robert Wiene, directed by F.W. Murnau, starring Fritz Kortner and Conrad Veidt; a small fragment of this film still exists at the Cinematheque Francaise
The Sentimental Bloke – (Australia)
Sir Arne's Treasure (Herr Arnes pengar), directed by Mauritz Stiller, starring Richard Lund – (Sweden)
A Society Exile directed by George Fitzmaurice starring Elsie Ferguson
Sons of Ingmar (Ingmarssönerna), directed by Victor Sjöström – (Sweden)
South (documentary of Sir Ernest Shackleton's Endurance Imperial Trans-Antarctic Expedition), filmed by Frank Hurley – (GB)

T
The Test of Honor, directed by John S. Robertson, starring John Barrymore , and Constance Binney
The Thirteenth Chair, directed by Leonce Perret, starring Yvonne Delva and Creighton Hale, based on a play by Bayard Veiller; this film was later remade by Tod Browning in 1929 with sound 
To Let (British) short ghost film directed by James Reardon, starring Reardon and Peggy Patterson
The Trembling Hour, directed by George Siegmann for Universal Films, starring Kenneth Harlan and Helen Jerome Eddy; parts of this film were shot in San Quentin State Prison in California
True Heart Susie, starring Lillian Gish and Bobby Harron
The Twin Pawns (aka The Curse of Greed) written and directed by Leonce Perret, starring Mae Murray (playing twins) and Warner Oland, based on the Wilkie Collins novel The Woman in White

V
The Valley of the Giants, directed by James Cruze, starring Wallace Reid
La Venganza de Don Silvestre, directed by Jose Nepomuceno - (Philippines)
Victory, directed by Maurice Tourneur, starring Lon Chaney, Seena Owen, Wallace Beery, Jack Holt

W
Weird Tales/ Unheimliche Geschichten/ Uncanny Tales (German) horror anthology written and directed by Richard Oswald, starring Conrad Veidt and Anita Berber; composed of 5 weird stories adapted from the works of Edgar Allan Poe, Robert Louis Stevenson and others
When the Clouds Roll By, starring Douglas Fairbanks
The White Heather, directed by Maurice Tourneur 
The Wicked Darling, directed by Tod Browning, starring Lon Chaney and Priscilla Dean
The Witness for the Defense starring Elsie Ferguson and Warner Oland

Y
Yankee Doodle in Berlin, directed by F. Richard Jones, starring Bothwell Browne, Ford Sterling, Marie Prevost, produced by Mack Sennett
You're Fired, directed by James Cruze, starring Wallace Reid & Wanda Hawley

Comedy film series
Only the films of the series released in 1919 are collected.

Buster Keaton (1917–1941)

Films starring Roscoe Arbuckle, featuring Buster Keaton released in 1919:
September 7: Back Stage a 'Fatty' Arbuckle / Buster Keaton short. 
October 26: The Hayseed as a Manager, general store.

Charlie Chaplin (1914–1923)

Charlie Chaplin wrote, produced, directed, and starred in 9 films for his own production company between 1918 and 1923. These films were distributed by First National. Below the movies filmed in 1919:
May 15: Sunnyside; Three reels Score composed for 1974 re-release
December 15: A Day's Pleasure; Two reels. First film with Jackie Coogan, future star of "The Kid"
Score composed for 1973 re-release

Uncompleted and unreleased films
The Professor as Professor Bosco, Slated as a two-reeler, but never issued

Harold Lloyd (1913–1921)

Glasses character ("The Boy"):
Wanted – $5,000 
Going! Going! Gone! 
Ask Father 
On the Fire, aka. The Chef 
I'm on My Way 
Look Out Below 
The Dutiful Dub 
Next Aisle Over 
A Sammy in Siberia 
Just Dropped In 
Young Mr. Jazz
Crack Your Heels 
Ring Up the Curtain, aka Back-Stage! 
Si, Senor 
Before Breakfast 
The Marathon 
Pistols for Breakfast 
Swat the Crook 
Off the Trolley 
Spring Fever 
Billy Blazes, Esq. – as Billy Blazes; the film was a parody of Westerns of the time
Just Neighbors
At the Old Stage Door 
Never Touched Me 
A Jazzed Honeymoon 
Count Your Change 
Chop Suey & Co. 
Heap Big Chief 
Don't Shove 
Be My Wife 
The Rajah 
He Leads, Others Follow 
Soft Money 
Count the Votes 
Pay Your Dues 
His Only Father 
Bumping Into Broadway 
Captain Kidd's Kids 
From Hand to Mouth

Animated short film series

Koko the Clown (1919–1934)
Koko the Clown was the first animated movie cartoon series. Below list of short films released in 1919:
The Tantalizing Fly
The Clown's Pups
Out of the Inkwell 
Slides
Experiment No. 2
Experiment No. 3
Out of the Inkwell

Felix the Cat (1919–1936)

Below list of Felix the Cat short films released in 1919:
November 9: Feline Follies 
November 16: The Musical Mews 
December 14: The Adventures of FelixBirths
January 1 – Carole Landis, actress (died 1948)
January 7 – Huang Feng, Hong Kong film director
January 10 - Amzie Strickland, American character actress (died 2006)
January 13 – Robert Stack, actor (died 2003)
January 21 – Jinx Falkenburg, model, actress (died 2003)
January 23 – Ernie Kovacs, comedian, actor (died 1962)
January 24 – Coleman Francis, American actor, director, producer, and screenwriter (died 1973)
February 4 – Janet Waldo, actress (died 2016)
February 5
Red Buttons, actor (died 2006)
Tim Holt, actor (died 1973)
February 11 – Eva Gabor, actress (died 1995)
February 12 – Forrest Tucker, actor (died 1986)
February 17 – Kathleen Freeman, actress (died 2001)
February 18 – Jack Palance, actor (died 2006)
March 2 – Jennifer Jones, actress (died 2009)
March 25 – Jeanne Cagney, actress (died 1984)
March 26 – Strother Martin, actress (died 1980)
March 29 – Eileen Heckart, actress (died 2001)
April 2 - Maxwell Reed, Northern Irish actor (died 1974)
April 6 - Caren Marsh Doll, American former actress
April 12 - Ivor Barry, Welsh actor (died 2006)
April 13 – Howard Keel, actor (died 2004)
April 18 – Vondell Darr, child actress (died 2012)
April 18 – Virginia O'Brien, American actress (died 2001)
May 8 – Lex Barker, actor (died 1973)
May 23 – Betty Garrett, actress (died 2011)
June 11 – Richard Todd, actor (died 2009)
June 12 – Uta Hagen, actress (died 2004)
June 14
June Spencer, English actress
Sam Wanamaker, director, actor (died 1993)
June 19 – Pauline Kael, film critic (died 2001)
June 24 – Al Molinaro, actor (died 2015)
June 29 – Slim Pickens, actor (died 1983)
July 7 – Jon Pertwee, actor (died 1996)
July 12 – Vera Ralston, figure skater, actress (died 2003)
July 19 – Patricia Medina, actress (died 2012)
July 26 – Virginia Gilmore, actress (died 1986)
August 2 – Nehemiah Persoff, actor (died 2022)
August 7 – Bertha Moss, Argentine-Mexican actress (died 2008)
August 8 – Dino De Laurentiis, producer (died 2010)
September 2 – Marge Champion, dancer, actress, choreographer (died 2020)
September 9 - Jacques Marin, French actor (died 2001)
September 17 - Helmut Ashley, Austrian cinematographer and director (died 2021)
September 18 – Diana Lewis, actress (died 1997)
September 24 – Rick Vallin, Russian-born actor (died 1977)
October 5 – Donald Pleasence, actor (died 1995)
October 18 - Orlando Drummond, Brazilian actor and comedian (died 2021)
October 20 - Lia Origoni, Italian actress and singer (died 2022)
October 28 - Ezz El-Dine Zulficar, Egyptian director and producer (died 1963)
November 4 
Shirley Mitchell, actress (died 2013)
Martin Balsam, actor (died 1996)
November 13 
Mary Beth Hughes, actress (died 1995)
Amelia Bence, actress (died 2016)
November 15 – Nova Pilbeam, actress (died 2015)
November 19
Lynn Merrick, actress (died 2007)
Alan Young, actor (died 2016)
November 20 - Phyllis Thaxter, American actress (died 2012)
December 5 - Guido Gorgatti, Italian-born Argentine actor
December 7 – Lis Løwert, Danish actress (d. 2009)
December 11 – Marie Windsor, American actress (d. 2000)
December 18 – Lynn Bari, American actress (d. 1989)
December 21 – Ove Sprogøe, Danish actor (d. 2004)

Deaths
January 14 – Shelley Hull, 34, American stage & film actor, husband of Josephine Hull, brother of Henry Hull
January 31 – Nat C. Goodwin, 59, veteran stage star & silent film actor
February 3 – Mary Moore (actress), 29, Irish actress, sister of Joe, Matt, Owen and Tom Moore A Million a MinuteFebruary 17 – Vera Kholodnaya, 25, Russian silent film actress, A Corpse Living, The Woman Who Invented Love, Her Sister's Rival, Song of Triumphant Love''
April 9 – Sidney Drew, 55, American stage & film actor A Florida Enchantment
May 3 – Daniel Gilfether, 70, American actor of stage & screen
May 21 – Lamar Johnstone, 34, American silent film actor
August 27 - Clifford Bruce, 34 American silent film actor
November 24 – William Stowell, 34, American silent film star

Film debuts
 Vilma Bánky – Im letzten Augenblick
 Shemp Howard – Spring Fever (short)
 Boris Karloff – The Lightning Raider
 Fritz Lang – Halbblut
 Norma Shearer – The Star Boarder (short) (uncredited)
 Otis Skinner – Tom's Little Star
 Claire Windsor – Eyes of Youth (uncredited)
 Anna May Wong – The Red Lantern (uncredited)

References

See also
List of American films of 1919

 
Film by year